The MTV Asia Awards 2002 in Singapore hosted by Mandy Moore and Ronan Keating. It was held on February 2, 2002. This was the first edition of the MTV Asia Awards.

International awards

Favorite Pop Act

Backstreet Boys
Destiny's Child
M2M
NSYNC
Westlife

Favorite Rock Act
Bon Jovi
Coldplay
Limp Bizkit
Linkin Park
U2

Favorite Video
Backstreet Boys — "The Call"
Christina Aguilera, Lil' Kim, Mýa & Pink — "Lady Marmalade"
Fatboy Slim — "Weapon of Choice"
Gorillaz — "19-2000"
NSYNC — "Pop"

Favorite Female Artist
Britney Spears
Christina Aguilera
Jennifer Lopez
Madonna
Mariah Carey

Favorite Male Artist
Eminem
Ricky Martin
Robbie Williams
Ronan Keating
Shaggy

Favorite Breakthrough Artist
Alicia Keys
Coldplay
Gorillaz
Linkin Park
Nelly Furtado

Favorite Movie
Charlie's Angels
Crouching Tiger, Hidden Dragon
Pearl Harbor
Rush Hour 2
Shrek
The Mummy Returns

Favorite Fashion Designer
Donatella Versace
John Galliano
Marc Jacobs
Miu Miu
Stella McCartney
Tom Ford

Regional awards

Favorite Artist Mainland China
Han Hong
Na Ying
Sun Nan
Ye Pei
Yu Quan

Favorite Artist Hong Kong
Andy Lau
Jacky Cheung
Kelly Chen
Nicholas Tse
Sammi Cheng

Favorite Artists India
Falguni Pathak
Lucky Ali
Mehnaz Hoosein
Sagarika
Shaan

Favorite Artist Indonesia
Dewa
Jamrud
Krisdayanti
Padi
Sheila on 7

Favorite Artist Korea
Kangta
Fin.K.L
g.o.d
Shinhwa
Yoo Seung-jun

Favorite Artist Malaysia
S. M. Salim
M. Nasir
Too Phat
Siti Nurhaliza
Ziana Zain

Favorite Artist Philippines
Freestyle
Gary Valenciano
Lea Salonga
Martin Nievera
Regine Velasquez

Favorite Artist Singapore
Dreamz FM
Kit Chan
Stefanie Sun
Stella Ng
Tanya Chua

Favorite Artist Thailand
Dome
Marsha
Pru
Tata Young
Thongchai McIntyre

Favorite Artist Taiwan
A-mei
Elva Hsiao
Jay Chou
Mayday
Wu Bai

Special awards

The Inspiration Award
Jackie Chan

Most Influential Artist Award
Ayumi Hamasaki

MTV Asia Awards
2002 music awards